Rapira is also a name for the Soviet 100 mm anti-tank gun T-12

Rapira (rapier) is an educational procedural programming language developed in the Soviet Union and implemented on the Agat computer, PDP-11 clones (Electronika, DVK, BK series), and Intel 8080 and Zilog Z80 clones (Korvet). It is interpreted with a dynamic type system and high level constructions. The language originally had a Russian-based set of reserved words (keywords), but English and Romanian were added later. It was considered more elegant and easier to use than Pascal implementations of the time.

Rapira was used to teach computer programming in Soviet schools. The integrated development environment included a text editor and a debugger.

Sample program:
 ПРОЦ СТАРТ()
     ВЫВОД: 'Привет, мир!!!'
 КОН ПРОЦ

The same, but using the English lexics [sic, from the article referenced below]:
 proc start()
      output: 'Hello, world!!!';
 end proc

Rapira's ideology was based on languages such as POP-2 and SETL, with strong influences from ALGOL.

Consequently, for example, Rapira implements a very strong, flexible, and interesting data structure, named a tuple''. in Rapira, these are heterogeneous lists with allowed operations such as indexing, joining, length count, getting of sublist, easy comparison, etc.

References

External links
, interpreter for English dialect of Rapira
Rapira Reborn, instructional book for learning Rapira
Non-English-based programming languages
Pascal programming language family
Procedural programming languages
Structured programming languages
Educational programming languages
Computing in the Soviet Union
Soviet inventions
Programming languages created in the 20th century